Holcosus thomasi, also known commonly as the rainbow ameiva, is a species of lizard in the family Teiidae. The species is native to Guatemala and the adjacent Mexican state of Chiapas.

References

thomasi
Reptiles of North America
Reptiles described in 1946